is a volleyball player from Japan, who competed at the 1996 Summer Olympics. She competed in three consecutive Summer Olympics, starting in 1988. She was considered the most valuable player at the Barcelona Games. She released a single under the solo project named Deka Moni in 2001. Since her retirement from professional volleyball she has been working as an actress, predominantly appearing in stage plays.

References
Profile at Hori Pro 

1967 births
Living people
Japanese women's volleyball players
Volleyball players at the 1988 Summer Olympics
Volleyball players at the 1992 Summer Olympics
Volleyball players at the 1996 Summer Olympics
Olympic volleyball players of Japan
Sportspeople from Tokyo Metropolis
People from Kodaira, Tokyo
Asian Games medalists in volleyball
Volleyball players at the 1990 Asian Games
Volleyball players at the 1994 Asian Games
Medalists at the 1990 Asian Games
Medalists at the 1994 Asian Games
Asian Games bronze medalists for Japan
Goodwill Games medalists in volleyball
Competitors at the 1994 Goodwill Games